The 2015 NCAA Division III women's basketball tournament was a single-elimination tournament that involved 64 teams playing to determine the winner of the NCAA Division III Women's Basketball Championship. It began on March 6, 2015, and concluded with the championship game on March 21, 2015, at the Van Noord Arena in Grand Rapids, Michigan.

The Thomas More Saints defeated the George Fox Bruins in the championship game, 83–63, to win their first national championship. The two remaining final four teams were the Montclair State Red Hawks and the Tufts Jumbos.

On November 16, 2016, the championship was vacated due to NCAA violations.

Bracket 
* – Denotes overtime period

Regional 1 – Grand Rapids, MI

Regional 2 – Upper Montclair, NJ

Regional 3 – Medford, MA

Regional 4 – Crestview Hills, KY

National Finals – Grand Rapids, Michigan

See also 
 2015 NCAA Division I women's basketball tournament
 2015 NCAA Division II women's basketball tournament
 2015 NCAA Division I men's basketball tournament
 2015 NCAA Division II men's basketball tournament
 2015 NCAA Division III men's basketball tournament
 2015 Women's National Invitation Tournament
 2015 National Invitation Tournament
 2015 NAIA Division I women's basketball tournament
 2015 NAIA Division II women's basketball tournament
 2015 NAIA Division I men's basketball tournament
 2015 NAIA Division II men's basketball tournament

References 

NCAA Division III women's basketball tournament
College basketball tournaments in Michigan
NCAA Division III women's basketball tournament
Thomas More Saints
George Fox Bruins
Sports in Grand Rapids, Michigan